Fourie is a South African surname originating from Huguenot settlers. Notable people with the surname include:

Johan Fourie (born 1959), South African middle-distance athlete
Abrie Fourie (born 1969), South Africa-born artist
 (1882–1941), South African minister of Mines and Industries
Charles J. Fourie (born 1965), South African playwright and director
Hendre Fourie (born 1979), South Africa-born English rugby union player
Jaco Fourie (born 1975), South African equestrian athlete
Jaque Fourie (born 1983), South African rugby union player
John Fourie (born 1939), South African golfer
Thinus Fourie (born 1979), South Africa-born Irish cricketer
Brenden Fourie (born 1970), South African cricketer
Yolani Fourie (born 1989), South African cricketer
Pierre Fourie (born 1943), South African boxer

See also
Fourie du Preez (born 1982), South African rugby union player
Minister of Home Affairs v Fourie, a South African law case which led to the legalisation of same-sex marriage in South Africa

Surnames of French origin
Afrikaans-language surnames